The TPC San Antonio Championship at the Oaks was a golf tournament on the Korn Ferry Tour. The tournament was one of several added to the Korn Ferry Tour schedule in 2020 as part of adjustments due to the COVID-19 pandemic. It was played in July 2020 on the Oaks Course at TPC San Antonio near San Antonio, Texas; the course also hosts the PGA Tour's Valero Texas Open. Davis Riley won the tournament by four strokes over Paul Barjon and Taylor Pendrith; all three would finish the 2020–21 Korn Ferry Tour season inside the top 25 in points, thereby earning promotion to the PGA Tour.

Winners

See also
TPC San Antonio Challenge

References

External links
Coverage on the Korn Ferry Tour's official site

Former Korn Ferry Tour events
Golf in Texas
Sports competitions in San Antonio
Recurring sporting events established in 2020
Recurring sporting events disestablished in 2020
2020 establishments in Texas
2020 disestablishments in Texas